The Man Without a Name (French: L'homme sans nom) is a 1943 French drama film directed by Léon Mathot and starring Jean Galland, André Alerme and Sylvie. The film's sets were designed by the art director Roland Quignon. It premiered in Paris, then under German Occupation.

Synopsis
Following an operation gone wrong, a famous Paris surgeon abandons his job and goes to live in a small Basque village. Called back to save the life of a young holidaymaker, he rediscovers his former talents.

Cast
 Jean Galland as 	Vincent Berteaux dit Monsieur Vincent
 André Alerme as 	Le docteur Pagès
 Sylvie as Madame Ourdebey
 Anne Laurens as 	La soeur de lait d'André
 Georges Rollin as 	André Ourdebey
 Gilberte Joney as Assomption
 Tichadel as L'innocent
 Marie Carlot as 	La maîtresse
 Danielle Godet as Une figurante
 Gisèle Grandpré as 	La mère d'Assomption

References

Bibliography
 Bertin-Maghit, Jean Pierre. Le cinéma français sous Vichy: les films français de 1940 à 1944. Revue du Cinéma Albatros, 1980.

External links 
 

1943 films
1940s French-language films
1943 drama films
French drama films
Films directed by Léon Mathot
1940s French films